Michael John Berryman (born September 4, 1948) is an American character actor. Berryman was born with hypohidrotic ectodermal dysplasia, a rare condition characterized by the absence of sweat glands, hair, and fingernails; his unusual physical appearance has allowed Berryman to make a career out of portraying characters in horror movies and B movies. He came to prominence with his roles in One Flew Over the Cuckoo's Nest in 1975 and The Hills Have Eyes in 1977. He has appeared in several movies and television shows, including Star Trek and The X-Files.

Personal life
Berryman is a strong advocate for environmental protection and lived on a wolf sanctuary for ten years. He is of partial German descent.

Berryman's father was a U.S. Navy surgeon and was deployed to the Hiroshima fallout zone in the wake of the atomic bombing.

Career 
Berryman played Pluto in Wes Craven's 1977 horror film The Hills Have Eyes and the 1985 sequel The Hills Have Eyes Part II. He has also made appearances in the science fiction and fantasy movies My Science Project (1985), Weird Science (1985), Armed Response (1986), Evil Spirits (1990), The Guyver (1991), and Brutal (2007). He appeared in the 1975 Academy Award-winning drama One Flew Over the Cuckoo's Nest. His time on set for The Hills Have Eyes proved difficult for him, since, during the 4-month shoot, temperatures in the desert routinely surpassed 100 degrees Fahrenheit and, without sweat glands, he had to take special precautions to avoid suffering heatstroke.

He had a role in The Crow (1994) as "The Skull Cowboy", Eric Draven's guide to the land of the living. Berryman's scenes were cut from the original theatrical release, but can be found on some DVD releases under "Deleted Scenes".

He has appeared in Star Trek and some episodes of The X-Files. He appeared in the 1985 Mötley Crüe video for "Smokin' In the Boys Room", as well as the introduction to the band's song "Home Sweet Home". He also portrayed the devil in two episodes of Highway to Heaven: "The Devil and Jonathan Smith" (1985) and "I Was a Middle-Aged Werewolf" (1987).

Berryman is a popular draw at genre conventions, such as the 2002 Horrorfind convention in Baltimore, Maryland, and the 2007 Eerie Horror Film Festival in Erie, Pennsylvania. He also appeared in 2001 and 2002 at the Horrorfind convention in Baltimore, Maryland and in Milwaukee, Wisconsin on June 7 and 8 attending as a guest of "The Milwaukee County Massacre", a horror film convention and music festival. Berryman appeared at the "Scarefest" convention in Lexington, Kentucky, and at the Spooky Empire convention in Orlando, Florida on October 17–19, 2008. He appeared in Roseville, Minnesota at Crypticon 2008 for "A November to Dismember" on November 14–16, 2008 for the show's third year.

Berryman starred in the British-Canadian horror film Below Zero (2012), directed by Justin Thomas Orstensen. He was also a special guest at the third annual San Antonio Horrific Film Fest in August 2010, the Cinema Wasteland convention in April 2011 and the Contamination Convention in Missouri in June 2012.
From 2014 to 2018 he played the founder of Zona in Z Nation.

Awards

Filmography 

 Doc Savage: The Man of Bronze (1975) as Coroner
 One Flew over the Cuckoo's Nest (1975) as Ellis
 The Hills Have Eyes (1977) as Pluto
 Another Man, Another Chance (1977) as First Bandit
 The Fifth Floor (1978) as Mental Patient
 Co-Ed (1980)
 Deadly Blessing (1981) as William Gluntz
 Likely Stories, Vol. 3 (1983) as Man on television commercial
 Voyage of the Rock Aliens (1984) as Chainsaw
 Invitation to Hell (1984) as Valet
 The Hills Have Eyes Part II (1984) as Pluto
 Weird Science (1985) as Mutant Biker
 Cut and Run (1985) as Quecho
 My Science Project (1985) as Mutant #1
 Armed Response (1986) as F.C.
 Star Trek IV: The Voyage Home (1986) as Starfleet display officer
 The Barbarians (1987) as Dirtmaster
 Off the Mark (1987) as Acme Labs Man
 Kenny Rogers as The Gambler, Part III (1987) as Cpl. Catlett
 Saturday the 14th Strikes Back (1988) as The Mummy
 Star Trek: The Next Generation: "Conspiracy" (1988) as Captain Rixx
 Star Trek V: The Final Frontier (1989) as Sybok Warrior (uncredited)
 Aftershock (1990) as Queen
 Solar Crisis (1990) as Matthew
 Evil Spirits (1990) as Mr. Balzac
 Far Out Man (1990) as Angry Biker
 The Guyver (1991) as Lisker
 Wizards of the Demon Sword (1991) as Highway Man #1
 Beastmaster 2: Through the Portal of Time (1991) as Pilgrim #1
 Teenage Exorcist (1991) as Herman
 The Secret of the Golden Eagle (1991)
 Tales from the Crypt: "The Reluctant Vampire" (1991) as Rupert Van Helsing
 Little Sister (1992) as Teacher
 Auntie Lee's Meat Pies (1992) as Larry
 The Crow (1994) as The Skull Cowboy (Scenes Deleted)
 Double Dragon (1994) as Maniac Leader
 Spy Hard (1996) as Bus Patron with Oxygen Mask
 Mojave Moon (1996) as Angel
 Gator King (1997) as The Tech
 The Independent (2000) as Himself
 Rebel Yell (2000) as Bouncer (uncredited)
 Two Heads are Better than None (2000) as Chives, the butler
 The Devil's Rejects (2005) as Clevon
 The Absence of Light (2006) as The Seer
 Fallen Angels (2006) as Mort
 Penny Dreadful (2006) as Gas Station Worker
 Ed Gein: The Butcher of Plainfield (2007) as Jack
 Dead Man's Hand (2007) as Gil Wachetta
 Brutal (2007) as Leroy Calhoun
 Brother's War (2009) as Col. Petrov
 Smash Cut (2009) as Philip Farmsworth, Jr.
 Outrage (2009) as Obeah
 Necrosis (2009) as Seymour
 The Tenant (2010) as Arthur Delman
 Satan Hates You (2010) as Mr. Harker
 Scooby-Doo! Curse of the Lake Monster (2010) as Zombie Head
 Mask Maker (2010) as Fred
 Below Zero (2011) as Gunnar
 Beg (2011) as Clayton Starks
 The Family (2011) as William
 The Lords of Salem (2012) as Virgil Magnus
 Self Storage (2013) as Trevor
 Army of the Damned (2013) as Crazy Earl
 Apocalypse Kiss (2014) as David Horn
 Erebus (2014) as Jonah Crane
 Kill or Be Killed (2015) as Dr. Pepperdine
 Smothered (2016) as Himself
 Potent Media's Sugar Skull Girls (2016) as Hobbs
 The Evil Within (2017) as Cadaver
 Death House (2017) as Crau
 Z Nation (2017) as The Founder
 ONE PLEASE (2017) as Ice Cream Man
 Violent Starr (2018) as The Godmichael
 Shed of the Dead (2019)
 Jasper (2022) as Jasper Davidson
 Room 9 (upcoming) Jed Bedford

References

External links 

Official Website
Michael Berryman at SmashCutMovie.com
Michael Berryman Interview at Love & Pop

1948 births
20th-century American male actors
American male film actors
American male television actors
American people of German descent
Living people
Male actors from Los Angeles